Ji Jing (born October 4, 1987) is a Chinese weightlifter. She competed in the 2011 World Weightlifting Championships and won a bronze medal.

References

1987 births
Living people
World Weightlifting Championships medalists
Chinese female weightlifters
Universiade medalists in weightlifting
Universiade gold medalists for China
Medalists at the 2011 Summer Universiade
21st-century Chinese women